The 2015 College Nationals was the 20th Women's College Nationals.  The College Nationals was a team handball tournament to determine the College National Champion from 2015 from the US.

Venues
The championship was played at two venues at the Auburn University in Auburn, Alabama.

Modus

The three teams played first a round-robin contest. The two first-placed teams played against each other in a final. Because there were only three teams, each team played a game against the Women's Residency team but these were only friendly games.

Results
Source:

Group stage

Final

Residency games

Final ranking
Source:

Awards
Source:

Top scorers

Source:

All-Tournament Team
Source:

References

External links
 Tournament Results archived

USA Team Handball College Nationals by year
Auburn Tigers